Paleophaedon is an extinct genus of chrysomeline leaf beetle described from the late Eocene Rovno amber of Ukraine. It was named by Konstantin Nadein and Evgeny Perkovsky in 2010, and the type species is Paleophaedon minutus.

References

†
Eocene insects
Fossil taxa described in 2010
Prehistoric insects of Europe
Rovno amber
Prehistoric beetle genera
†